Grosmont is a rural locality in the Western Downs Region, Queensland, Australia.

Geography 
The Leichhardt Highway passes through the locality from south-east to north-east.

History 
Grosmount State School opened on 4 February 1957.

Education 
Grosmont State School is a government primary (Prep-6) school for boys at 2524 Grosmont Road. In 2016, the school had an enrolment of 2 students with 3 teachers (1 full-time equivalent) and 1 non-teaching staff. In 2018, the school had an enrolment of 2 students with 2 teachers (1 full-time equivalent) and 1 non-teaching staff.

There is no secondary school in Grosmont. The nearest government secondary schools are Wandoan State School (to Year 10) in neighbouring Wandoan to the south-east and Taroom State School (to Year 10) in neighbouring Taroom to the north. For secondary schooling to Year 12, the nearest government school is Miles State High School in Miles to the south-east. Distance education and boarding schools would be other options.

References

Further reading 
 

Western Downs Region
Localities in Queensland